Alejandro Flores Pinaud  (1896–1962) was a Chilean poet, dramatist and actor. He was born on February 9, 1896, in Santiago de Chile and died on January 6, 1962.

Education
Flores attended the St. Joseph Patron Saint school and the San Pedro Nolasco. Being young, he became interested in theater career, but only recognized his true calling when he came into contact with the Spanish actor and poet Bernardo Jambrina.

Career
He began writing several lyrical pieces, with one of which in 1919 he staged a show that appeared at the Comedy Theatre, entitled "El derrumbe" (the collapse). He was not only the creator of the script, but he played the lead role. Two years later, his "Malhaya tu corazón" ("Curse your heart"), repeated the success of his debut feature.

He also made his career in Argentina where, in 1922, he married Carmen Moreno Jofré. He was a devoted admirer of the heroes of the Independence of Chile, the reason that led him to become a collector patient of whatever object that may be linked to these heroes. One of the specific manifestations of this sentiment was the creation of the Museum of the Patria Vieja, in a central house of Rancagua, where he resided for some years. This museum opened its doors on October 24, 1950. The president at the time, Gabriel González Videla, and a good set of authorities and respectable neighbors of the city  attended its inauguration.

Recognition
In 1946, the Chilean government distinguished his career with the National Art Award.

Influence 
In his book, 'The dance of reality', Alejandro Jodorowsky  evokes his namesake Alejandro Flores in whose troupe he worked for a short time. The latter taught him the power of the name: 'It was the first time that someone told me that if we exalted our name it became the most powerful amulet... Alejandro Flores is a sound amulet that fills theatres... Go and inseminate your own name, learn to love it, to exalt it, to discover what treasures it contains.'

Selected filmography
The House is Empty (1945)

References

External links
 Blog on Alejandro Flores (in Spanish)

1896 births
1962 deaths
Chilean male dramatists and playwrights
Chilean male poets
People from Santiago
20th-century Chilean poets
20th-century Chilean male writers
20th-century Chilean dramatists and playwrights